Admiral Bailey (born Glendon Bailey, Kingston, Jamaica) is a Jamaican dancehall deejay who enjoyed his greatest success between the mid-1980s and the early 1990s. He now lives in Jamaica. He has been described as "the hottest dancehall star of the late 1980s".

Career
Bailey had worked on U-Roy's King Sturgav Hi-Fi sound system and was taken to King Jammy's studio in Waterhouse by Josey Wales. He started a string of hits with a duet with Chaka Demus, "One Scotch, One Bourbon, One Beer", which was followed by "Politician" (based on Larry Marshall's 1969 hit "Throw Me Corn"), "Chatty Chatty Mouth", "Ballot Box" (with Josey Wales) and, in 1987, the slack "Punaany" (with a lyric that included "Gimme Punaany, Want punaany, Any punaany is the same punaany"), which was initially banned from radio play until it was re-recorded with a less offensive lyric, retitled "Healthy Body". His debut album, Kill Them With It, was released in 1987 and he went on to record for producers such as Papa Biggy and Donovan Germain. He recorded further for Penthouse Records ("Help") in 1990 and Bobby Digital ("Ah Nuh Sin") in 1991. In 1993, he began working with Jammy again. In the 1990s he became known as a "clean" deejay, eschewing the slackness of many of his contemporaries. He recorded with Byron Lee on some of the latter's big soca hits, and even starred in television commercials for banks.

Discography
 Kill Them With It (1987) Jammys/Live & Love
 Dancehall Showcase Vol. 2: M.C.'s Clash (1987) Mango (with Tonto Irie)
 Undisputed (1988) Dynamic
 Ram Up You Party (1988) Powerhouse
 Science Again (1989) Rohit
 Born Champion (1991) Jammys/Live & Love
 Original (1991) VP
 Mi Big Up (1992) VP
 Undisputed Champion (1993) Rhino
 Best of Reggae: Live (2006) Super Power

References

Year of birth missing (living people)
Living people
Jamaican dancehall musicians
Jamaican reggae musicians
Musicians from Kingston, Jamaica
VP Records artists
Rhino Records artists